"PASHA Holding" Limited Liability Company (PASHA Holding or PASHA Holding LLC) through its subsidiaries, invests in banking and finance, insurance, information technology, retail, construction, hospitality and agriculture, the property development and tourism sectors. The Holding has two types of Investment assets portfolios: Controlling stakes in PASHA Holding and its subsidiaries and minority private equity investments. It is owned and controlled by the Pashayev family.

Banking
Current volume of paid-in capital of the Bank amounts to 333 million AZN. The total number of its shareholders comprises 2 legal entities and 1 physical person. The bank's shareholders are PASHA Holding Ltd. (60%), Ador Ltd. (30%) and Mr. Arif Pashayev (10%).

Travel and tourism

PASHA Travel
PASHA Travel was founded in 2003.

Absheron Hotel Group
Absheron Hotel Group was established in 2013. It manages the following properties:

 Pik Palace, Shahdag, Autograph Collection
 Park Chalet, Shahdag, Autograph Collection
 Boulevard Hotel, Baku, Autograph Collection
 Sheraton Baku Intourist, Baku, Autograph Collection
 Bilgah Beach Hotel, Baku
 The Merchant Baku, Baku
 Courtyard Hotel, Baku
 Dinamo Hotel, Baku, member of SLH (Small Luxury Hotels of the World)
 Allium Villas Resort, Bodrum / Turkey, member of L.V.X. (Preferred Hotels & Resorts)

Insurance
PASHA Insurance was founded in 2006. PASHA Life Insurance OJSC is a member of the Compulsory Insurance Bureau.

Construction
PASHA Construction
PASHA Development

References

Holding companies of Azerbaijan
Holding companies established in 2006